Diansi is a village in the Fara Department of Balé Province in southern Burkina Faso. The town has a total population of 182.

References

Populated places in the Boucle du Mouhoun Region